James Dudley "Jay" Disharoon (March 10, 1949 – June 10, 2014) was an American lawyer and politician.

Born in Jackson, Mississippi, Disharoon grew up in Port Gibson, Mississippi and went to Port Gibson High School. He served in the United States Army. Disharoon received his bachelor's degree from Mississippi State University and his Juris Doctor degree from University of Mississippi School of Law. He served in the Mississippi House of Representatives, from 1976 to 1980, as a Democrat and then in the Mississippi State Senate from 1980 to 1988. Disharoon and his son Jamie were killed in a traffic accident in Jackson, Mississippi.

Notes

1949 births
2014 deaths
Politicians from Jackson, Mississippi
People from Port Gibson, Mississippi
Mississippi State University alumni
University of Mississippi School of Law alumni
Democratic Party members of the Mississippi House of Representatives
Democratic Party Mississippi state senators
Road incident deaths in Mississippi
Lawyers from Jackson, Mississippi
20th-century American lawyers